Germanton Methodist Church and Cemetery is a historic Methodist church and cemetery located on Main Street at the junction of Main Street and Willow Street in Germanton, Stokes County, North Carolina. It was built in 1856, and is a simple two-story, rectangular brick building with a front gable roof, with Greek Revival detailing.  It features a central three-part belfry atop the roof. The cemetery contains markers dated to the 1820s.

It was added to the National Register of Historic Places in 1998.

References

Methodist churches in North Carolina
Cemeteries in North Carolina
Churches on the National Register of Historic Places in North Carolina
Prairie School architecture in North Carolina
Churches completed in 1856
19th-century Methodist church buildings in the United States
Churches in Stokes County, North Carolina
Methodist cemeteries
National Register of Historic Places in Stokes County, North Carolina